Charlie Fry was an Australian rules footballer for the Port Adelaide Football Club.

Football 
He was a member of Port Adelaide's first premiership team in 1884.

Personal life 
Charlie's brother James also played for Port Adelaide.

References

Port Adelaide Football Club players (all competitions)